Stuart Bowman is a Scottish actor, born in Dundee and brought up in Fife and Clackmannanshire. He is known for playing head of MI5, Stephen Hunter-Dunn in the BBC's Bodyguard, his regular appearances as Sergeant Thomson in Gary: Tank Commander, and for his portrayal of Alexandre Bontemps in the Canal+ series Versailles.

Bowman was an established character actor on television, but his role as Bontemps raised his public profile. It necessitated living in Paris for the three years that Versailles took to film. Afterwards he said that he did not regret the conclusion of the series. "With Bontemps I don't think there was much I would be able to do with him beyond season three...So, for me, it felt right and natural that it was finishing there."

Personal life
Bowman lives with his partner, Candida Benson, and their two children, Tavish and Sholto, in Hackney, East London. The children received their early education in France, while Bowman was filming Versailles.

Filmography

Film

Television

Theatre

References

External links

Stuart Bowman — Spotlight
Stuart Bowman — Qvoice

Living people
Scottish male stage actors
Scottish male television actors
Male actors from Dundee
Year of birth missing (living people)